Grass surface may refer to:
generally:
 Lawn, a area of land covered with short grasses
 Sod, or turf, the upper layer of soil and grass roots of a lawn
specifically, the grass surface in particular contexts:
Grass court, in tennis
Sports turf, more broadly (e.g. Grass field or Football pitch#Turf) 
a pavement type in airport runways